Julia Charlotte L. Davis (born 25 August 1966) is an English actress, comedian, director and writer. She is known for writing and starring in the BBC Three comedy Nighty Night (2004–2005) and the comedies Hunderby (2012–2015) and Camping (2016), which she also directed. Davis has been noted by critics for creating boundary-pushing black comedy that centres female anti-hero characters.

A nine-time BAFTA TV Award nominee, she won Best Comedy Writing for Hunderby in 2013 and the 2018 British Academy Television Award for Best Scripted Comedy for Sally4Ever. She has also received two RTS Awards and three British Comedy Awards. In addition to acting in her own works, she has appeared in a variety of other British television comedies, most notably portraying Dawn Sutcliffe in Gavin & Stacey (2007–2009, 2019). Her film roles include Love Actually (2003), Cemetery Junction (2010), Four Lions (2010) and the critically acclaimed Phantom Thread (2017).

Early life
Davis was born on 25 August 1966 in Lambeth, London, 
to a secretary mother and a civil servant father, and grew up in Guildford, Surrey before moving at the age of 14 to Bath, Somerset. She was raised in the Church of England. After studying for a degree in English and Drama at the College of Ripon and York St John, she returned to Bath working "dead-end jobs", starting a comedy double-act The Sisters of Percy with her friend Jane Roth at a local theatre group. It grew into an improv troupe with Welsh radio DJ Rob Brydon and Ruth Jones.

Career

1998–2006: Career beginnings, Human Remains and Nighty Night
Davis secured her first comedy commission, Five Squeezy Pieces, from BBC Radio 4 in 1998. The series was an all-female sketch comedy show, with Meera Syal, Arabella Weir, 
Maria McErlane and Claire Calman.

During their radio sketch series, Five Squeezy Pieces, Arabella Weir introduced Davis to Arthur Mathews and Graham Linehan who cast her as a regular cast member in the television sketch show Big Train (1998). Her career gained a further boost in 1998 after she sent a tape of various characters to Steve Coogan, who invited her to write for and participate in his shows during his 1998 national tour. Chris Morris, director of the Big Train pilot, cast her for his 1997–1999 radio series Blue Jam, its successor March–April 2000 TV show Jam, and Brass Eye. Davis went on to appear in many comedy television shows including I'm Alan Partridge, I Am Not an Animal, Dr. Terrible's House of Horrible, Ideal and Nathan Barley.

In November 2000, Human Remains, a dark comedy television series, co-written by and co-starring Rob Brydon and Davis, debuted on BBC Two. In the six-part series, Brydon and Davis played six different couples talking to camera about their unusual relationships. The last episode of The Office features Davis, who is heard on the phone as the voice of a woman from a dating agency in conversation with David Brent. Davis also appeared in 2003 film and Love Actually.

In 2004 and 2005, Davis wrote and starred in two series of the BBC Three dark comedy Nighty Night. The show is centred on her character of peroxide "blonde" sociopathic beauty therapist Jill Tyrell.

2007–2010: Gavin & Stacey and Lizzie & Sarah
From 2007 to 2009, she played Dawn Sutcliffe in Gavin & Stacey, a role which she reprised in 2019 for a Christmas special. In 2008, she appeared on Little Britain Abroad as a sexy Russian mail-order bride called Ivanka.

In 2009 Davis appeared, in the guise of Steve Coogan's personal assistant Debbie Bidwoden, in the TV film Steve Coogan – The Inside Story.

In 2010, she co-wrote and co-starred in Lizzie and Sarah with Jessica Hynes. The pilot aired on 20 March 2010 on BBC Two. It was made by Baby Cow Productions, and was considered even darker than Davis's previous work; when the BBC did not commission the remaining episodes of the series, there were online protests.

2011–2014: Black Mirror, Psychobitches and Hunderby
Davis has also starred in productions such as the BBC's For the Love of God, The Alan Clark Diaries, Fear of Fanny, in which she played the original celebrity chef Fanny Cradock, and Persuasion, an adaptation of the Jane Austen novel. In December 2011, Davis appeared in "Fifteen Million Merits", an episode of the anthology series Black Mirror, as Judge Charity on the fictional talent show Hot Shot.

On 22 December 2011, she appeared as Anne Yeaman in the Christmas special and finale of the BBC Three comedy How Not to Live Your Life. Davis appeared in the pilot episode of Bad Sugar, shown on Channel 4 on 26 August 2012. A full series was set to air in 2013, but was cancelled due to availability of the cast and writers. In 2013 Davis played various characters in BBC sketch show It's Kevin and in Psychobitches on Sky Arts. She appeared in an episode of Inside No. 9 as a stage manager. Davis created, wrote and starred in Hunderby, which aired for two series on Sky Atlantic in 2012 and 2015. For Hunderby, Davis won the BAFTA TV Craft Award for Writing – Comedy. At the 2013 BAFTA TV Awards, Hunderby was nominated for Best Scripted Comedy and Davis was nominated for Best Female Performance in a Comedy Programme. At the 2012 British Comedy Awards, Hunderby won the awards for Best New Comedy and Best Sitcom.

In 2014, she cowrote and starred in a pilot for Channel 4 called Morning Has Broken, about a struggling daytime TV host. A full series of Morning Has Broken was commissioned but ultimately did not happen. She starred as an eccentric mother in the comedy short film The Bird.

2015–present: Camping, Sally4Ever and podcast
In 2015, Davis and Marc Wootton created and starred in BBC Radio 4 comedy series Couples, about couples in therapy. It was reported in 2015 that Davis had been commissioned for a new series, Robin's Test, which was later renamed Camping.

In 2016 Davis wrote, directed and starred as shallow nymphomaniac "Fay" in Camping on Sky Atlantic. This was her directorial debut. At the 2017 BAFTA TV Awards, Camping was nominated for Best Scripted Comedy. In 2017, Davis was featured in the Paul Thomas Anderson film Phantom Thread as Lady Baltimore. 

In 2018 Davis wrote, directed and starred in the comedy television series Sally4Ever on Sky Atlantic and HBO. Davis plays the character of Emma, who is having a lesbian affair with a woman called Sally, who is having a midlife crisis. At the 2019 BAFTA awards it won the award for Best Scripted Comedy and Davis was nominated for Best Female Performance in a Comedy Programme. She also appeared in the film Fighting with My Family.

Davis launched the podcast comedy Dear Joan And Jericha with comedian Vicki Pepperdine in 2018. The series has 27 episodes as of November 2021. Davis and Pepperdine published a book on the back of the podcast, Why He Turns Away: Dos and Don'ts From Dating to Death.

Davis played socialite Maureen, Marchioness of Dufferin and Ava, in BBC One historical drama A Very British Scandal, which premiered on BBC One on Boxing Day 2021.

In 2022, Davis appeared in two episodes of The Outlaws, as Rita.

Influences 
Davis cites Julie Walters as giving her the confidence to pursue a career in comedy.

Discussing her influences for the character of Jill in Nighty Night, Davis told Guardian that "Most of Jill is an amalgam of women I've seen or worked with in the West Country."

Personal life
Since 2010 Davis has been in a relationship with comedian Julian Barratt of The Mighty Boosh. The couple are the parents of twins Arthur and Walter.

Filmography

Film

Television

Radio

References

External links

Julia Davis biography and credits on BBC comedy 

English stage actresses
English television actresses
English radio actresses
English voice actresses
English television producers
English comedy writers
English women comedians
Alumni of York St John University
British women television writers
1966 births
Living people
People from Bath, Somerset
Actresses from London
People from Lambeth
Actors from Guildford
Actresses from Somerset
Actresses from Surrey
21st-century English actresses
British comedy actresses
WFTV Award winners
British women television producers
British television producers
BAFTA winners (people)